Reqwireless was a software company specializing in delivering HTML and rich email content to Java ME/MIDP-capable cellphones. Reqwireless was acquired by Google in July 2005.

Reqwireless WebViewer is a Web browser for Java ME MIDP devices.
WebViewer supports HTML along with GIF and JPEG images, providing users of mobile Java devices with access to the real Web. WebViewer is not a WAP browser. WebViewer is just 48K as a JAR file and is built upon ReqwirelessWeb, a class library for fetching and rendering HTML. WebViewer supports the following features:
 HTML, including forms and image maps
 GIF, JPEG, PNG, and BMP images
 HTTP, FTP, and gopher resources
 HTTP cookies
 JavaScript
 HTTP Basic authentication
 HTTPS (if supported by the device)
 Bookmarks
 History
 Web cache

References

External links
 Google acquires Reqwireless
 Archived site: 

Google acquisitions
Telecommunications companies of Canada